Adrian Cahill (9 June 1971 – 7 November 2020) was an Irish hurler who played as a right wing-back for the Offaly senior team.

Born in Birr, County Offaly, Cahill first played competitive hurling in his youth. He first came to prominence on the inter-county scene at the age of sixteen when he first linked up with the Offaly minor team, before later joining the under-21 side. He made his senior debut during the 1989–90 National League and immediately became a regular member of the team. During his career Cahill won a set of Leinster and National Hurling League medals as a non-playing substitute.

At club level Cahill is a one-time All-Ireland medallist with Birr. In addition to this he also won two Leinster medals and one championship medal.

His retirement came during the 1993–94 National League.

Cahill's brother, Gary, also enjoyed a lengthy career with Offaly.

Honours

Team

Birr
All-Ireland Senior Club Hurling Championship (1): 1995
Leinster Senior Club Hurling Championship (2): 1991, 1994
Offaly Senior Club Hurling Championship (2): 1991, 1994

Offaly
Leinster Senior Hurling Championship (1): 1990
National Hurling League (1): 1990-91
Leinster Under-21 Hurling Championship (1): 1989
All-Ireland Minor Hurling Championship (2): 1987, 1989
Leinster Minor Hurling Championship (2): 1987, 1989

References

1971 births
2020 deaths
Birr hurlers
Offaly inter-county hurlers